The 2016 Auckland Open (currently sponsored by ASB) was a joint 2016 ATP World Tour and 2016 WTA Tour tennis tournament, played on outdoor hard courts. It was the 31st edition of the women's event, and the 40th edition of the men's event. It took place at the ASB Tennis Centre in Auckland, New Zealand, from 4 to 9 January 2016 for the women, and from 11 to 16 January 2016 for the men.

Points and prize money

Point distribution

Prize money 

1 Qualifiers' prize money is also the Round of 32 prize money
* per team

ATP singles main-draw entrants

Seeds 

1 Rankings as of 4 January 2016

Other entrants 
The following players received wildcards into the singles main draw:
  David Ferrer
  Finn Tearney
  Michael Venus

The following players received entry from the qualifying draw:
  Matthew Barton
  Benjamin Becker
  Thiemo de Bakker
  Robin Haase

Retirements 
  Aljaž Bedene (leg injury)
  Jack Sock (illness)

ATP doubles main-draw entrants

Seeds 

1 Rankings as of 4 January 2016

Other entrants 
The following pairs received wildcards into the doubles main draw:
  Marcus Daniell /  Artem Sitak
  Finn Tearney /  Wesley Whitehouse

The following pair received entry as alternates:
  Víctor Estrella Burgos /  Albert Ramos Viñolas

Withdrawals 
Before the tournament
  Aljaž Bedene (leg injury)
During the tournament
  John Isner (knee injury)
  Sam Querrey (tiredness & knee injury)

WTA singles main-draw entrants

Seeds 

1 Rankings as of 28 December 2015.

Other entrants 
The following players received wildcards into the singles main draw: 
  Marina Erakovic
  Jeļena Ostapenko
  Francesca Schiavone

The following players received entry from the qualifying draw:
  Kiki Bertens
  Naomi Broady
  Kirsten Flipkens
  Tamira Paszek

Retirements 
  Mona Barthel (illness)

WTA doubles main-draw entrants

Seeds 

1 Rankings as of 28 December 2015.

Other entrants 
The following pairs received wildcards into the doubles main draw:
  Rosie Cheng /  Sacha Jones
  Kirsten Flipkens /  Ana Ivanovic

Withdrawals 
During the tournament
  Ana Ivanovic (dizziness)

Champions

Men's singles 

  Roberto Bautista Agut def.  Jack Sock, 6–1, 1–0, ret.

Women's singles 

  Sloane Stephens def.  Julia Görges, 7–5, 6–2

Men's doubles 

  Mate Pavić /  Michael Venus def.  Eric Butorac /  Scott Lipsky, 7–5, 6–4

Women's doubles 

  Elise Mertens /  An-Sophie Mestach def.  Danka Kovinić /  Barbora Strýcová, 2–6, 6–3, [10–5]

References

External links 
 Official website

2016 ATP World Tour
2016 WTA Tour
2016
2016
ASB
2016 in New Zealand tennis
January 2016 sports events in New Zealand